Alex Caldwell is a former association football player who represented New Zealand at international level.

Caldwell made a solitary official international appearance for New Zealand in a 3–1 win over Singapore on 8 November 1967 at the Vietnam National day tournament.

References 

Year of birth missing (living people)
Living people
New Zealand association footballers
New Zealand international footballers
Association footballers not categorized by position